The Bahamas made its Paralympic Games début at the 1972 Summer Paralympics in Heidelberg, West Germany. The country's delegation consisted in a single athlete, John Sands. Sands competed in one event: the men's 60m wheelchair sprint, in category 1B. He completed his race in 34.8s, which placed him 22nd overall in the heats, and did not enable him to advance to the final. The event was ultimately won by West German athlete Baumgartner (full name not recorded), in 19s.

Athletics

See also
 Bahamas at the 1972 Summer Olympics

References

Nations at the 1972 Summer Paralympics
1972
Paralympics